Cub Records was an American record label, and a subsidiary of MGM Records, which started in 1958 for rhythm and blues releases.

Artists who released records on Cub included the Impalas ("Sorry (I Ran All the Way Home)"), Jimmy Jones ("Handy Man", "Good Timin'"), the Stereos ("I Really Love You"), and Jimmy Velvit ("Sometimes At Night", "We Belong Together").  The label lasted until 1968.

See also
 List of record labels

References

External links
 Cub Records album discography from BSN Pubs
 45 rpm discography from Global Dog Productions

Defunct record labels of the United States
MGM Records
Record labels established in 1958
Record labels disestablished in 1968
1958 establishments in the United States